The Çineköy inscription is an ancient bilingual inscription, written in Hieroglyphic Luwian and Phoenician languages. The inscription is dated to the second half of the 8th century BC. It was uncovered in 1997 near the village of Çine, that is located some 30 km south of Adana, capital city of the Adana Province (ancient Cilicia) in southern Turkey.

The find was first reported and described in 1999, and the first edition of the inscription was published in 2000. Important additions to interpretation of the inscription were made in 2007, 2012, 2015, and 2017.

Another important inscription of the same type is known as the Karatepe inscription, which was known earlier. Both of these inscriptions trace the kings of ancient Adana from the "house of Mopsos" (given in Hieroglyphic Luwian as Muksa and in Phoenician as Mopsos in the form mps). He was a legendary king of antiquity.

Background
The object on which the inscription is found is a monument to the Storm God Tarhunza. The inscription was authored by the ruler known as Urikki in Assyrian texts, which is equivalent to War(a)ika in Luwian. The question whether it is the same person as Awar(i)ku of the Karatepe inscription or a different one remains debatable. He was the vassal king of Quwê (Assyrian name), the modern Cilicia. In Luwian this region was known as 'Hiyawa'.

In this monumental inscription, Urikki made reference to the relationship between his kingdom and his Assyrian overlords. Also, in the Phoenician version of the inscription, Awariku claims to have built 15 fortresses in his kingdom. In the Luwian version of the same inscription, the same sentence is misinterpreted as a reference to destroying fortresses.

Syria as Luwian designation for Assyria

The Çineköy inscription has a special significance for determining the origin (etymology) of the term Syria, a question that was debated among scholars since 1871, when Theodor Nöldeke proposed a linguistic explanation based on derivation of Syria from Assyria. That explanation received a majority support among scholars. Discovery of the Çineköy inscription provided additional evidence for direct connection between terms Syria and Assyria. Phoenician section of the inscription mentions  (Ashur), and also  (Assyrians), while Luwian section narrates the same content by using  (Syria). Analyzing the inscription, historian Robert Rollinger pointed out in 2006 that Luwian section provides conclusive evidence for the original use of the term Syria as synonym for Assyria, thus settling the question.

The examined section of the Phoenician inscription reads:
And the king [of Aššur and (?)]
the whole “House” of Aššur (’ŠR) were for me a father [and a]
mother, and the DNNYM and the Assyrians (’ŠRYM)
were a single “House.”

The corresponding section of the Luwian inscription reads:
§VI And then, the/an Assyrian king (su+ra/i-wa/i-ni-sa(URBS)) and the whole Assyrian "House" (su+ra/i-wa/i-za-ha(URBS)) were made a fa[ther and a mo]ther for me,§VII and Hiyawa and Assyria (su+ra/i-wa/i-ia-sa-ha(URBS)) were made a single “House.”

Noting the scholarly consensus on the interpretation of terms Syria/Assyria in the Çineköy inscription, some researchers have also analyzed similar terms, that appear in other contemporary inscriptions, suggesting some additional interpretations.

See also

 Name of Syria
 Terms for Syriac Christians
 Luwian-Aramean states
 Karatepe bilingual

References

Sources

External links
Inscription From 800 BC Shows the Origin of the Name 'Syria'
Nytt fynd stärker samband mellan suroye-asuroye (in Swedish)
Neue Entdeckung erhöht Verbindung zwischen Suroye und Asuroye (in German)

8th-century BC works
1997 archaeological discoveries
Anatolia
Quwê
Assyriology
Luwian inscriptions
Phoenician inscriptions
Multilingual texts
Archaeological discoveries in Turkey
Archaeological artifacts